Smithfield Historic District may refer to:

Smithfield Historic District (Birmingham, Alabama), listed on the National Register of Historic Places listings in Jefferson County, Alabama
Smithfield Historic District (Smithfield, Virginia), listed on the National Register of Historic Places listings in Isle of Wight County, Virginia
Downtown Smithfield Historic District, Smithfield, North Carolina, listed on the National Register of Historic Places listings in Johnston County, North Carolina
North Smithfield Historic District, Smithfield, North Carolina, listed on the National Register of Historic Places listings in Johnston County, North Carolina

See also
Smithfield Farm, Berryville, Virginia, a historic district listed on the NRHP in Virginia
Smithfield Road Historic District, North Smithfield, Rhode Island
Smithfield (Blacksburg, Virginia), listed on the NRHP in Virginia
Smithfield (Rosedale, Virginia), a historic district listed on the NRHP in Virginia